In the Tradition is jazz saxophonist Arthur Blythe's first album for the Columbia label recorded in New York City in 1978.

Reception
The AllMusic review by Scott Yanow states: "The instrumentation of his quartet is conventional but the musicianship is exceptionally high".

Track listing
All compositions by Arthur Blythe except as indicated
 "Jitterbug Waltz" (Fats Waller) - 4:34    
 "In a Sentimental Mood" (Duke Ellington) - 7:45     
 "Break Tune" - 3:03     
 "Caravan" (Juan Tizol) - 5:22    
 "Hip Dripper" - 4:35     
 "Naima" (John Coltrane) - 6:44  
Recorded at the Brook in New York City on February 26, 1977.

Personnel
Arthur Blythe - alto saxophone 
Stanley Cowell - piano
Fred Hopkins - bass 
Steve McCall - drums

References

1979 albums
Columbia Records albums
Arthur Blythe albums